Jack Dougherty (born May 25, 1996) is an American professional ice hockey defenseman who is currently playing with the Kölner Haie in the Deutsche Eishockey Liga (DEL). Dougherty was selected by the Nashville Predators in the second round (51st overall) of the 2014 NHL Entry Draft.

Playing career
Dougherty was born in Saint Paul, Minnesota, but grew up in Cottage Grove, Minnesota. He was rated as a top prospect who was projected as a possible first round selection in the 2014 NHL Entry Draft. He trained with the USA Hockey National Team Development Program team during the 2013–14 season, and was invited to participate in the 2013 CCM/USA Hockey All-American Prospects Game. In October 2013 he committed to play for the Wisconsin Badgers men's ice hockey team of the NCAA Big Ten Conference.

On July 24, 2015, Dougherty signed a three-year entry level contract with the Predators. As a result, Dougherty was sent to the Portland Winterhawks of the Western Hockey League, the team which held his major junior rights.

Prior to the 2018–19 season, on October 1, 2018, Dougherty was traded by the Predators to the Buffalo Sabres in exchange for Nicholas Baptiste. With the Sabres' AHL affiliate, the Rochester Americans, he compiled 2 goals and 10 assists for 12 points in 56 games from the blueline.

Following the conclusion of his entry-level deal with the Sabres, on June 25, 2019, Dougherty was not tendered a qualifying offer by Buffalo, releasing him to free agency. On July 10, 2019, Dougherty agreed to a one-year AHL contract with the Belleville Senators, affiliate to the Ottawa Senators, on July 10, 2019.

Having left the Senators organization as a free agent, Dougherty was signed to a one-year AHL contract with the Providence Bruins on September 30, 2021, and was invited to the Boston Bruins training camp on a professional try-out. He appeared in just one game with Providence to start the 2020–21 season, before he was later returned in a trade for future considerations to former club, the Belleville Senators, on November 23, 2021.

Unable to secure an AHL contract for the 2022–23 season, Dougherty was signed as a free agent to a contract with the Orlando Solar Bears of the ECHL on October 12, 2022. Following 19 games with the Bears, Dougherty returned to the Belleville Senators in the AHL, making 15 further regular season appearances.

On February 16, 2023, having left the AHL, Dougherty was immediately signed for the remainder of the 2022–23 season, by German club Kölner Haie of the DEL.

International play
As a 16-year-old he was named to the USA U17 Select team to play in the 2012 Five Nations Cup tournament held in the Czech Republic in August 2012.
As a 17-year-old, Dougherty was chosen to compete with the American U-18 squad at the 2013 Ivan Hlinka Memorial Tournament where he won a silver medal, and he also helped Team USA capture the gold medal at the 2014 IIHF World U18 Championships.

Career statistics

Regular season and playoffs

International

Awards and honors

References

External links 

1996 births
Living people
American men's ice hockey defensemen
Belleville Senators players
Ice hockey people from Saint Paul, Minnesota
Milwaukee Admirals players
Nashville Predators draft picks
Orlando Solar Bears (ECHL) players
People from Cottage Grove, Minnesota
Portland Winterhawks players
Rochester Americans players
USA Hockey National Team Development Program players